Formula One is the highest class of auto racing sanctioned by the FIA.

Formula One or Formula 1 may also refer to:

Motorsports
 Formula I, a former category of Formula TT motorcycle racing
 Formula One Air Racing
 F1 Powerboat World Championship
 Formula First, an open-wheel open-cockpit single-seater junior formula championship
 BriSCA Formula 1, a British Stock Car Association racing formula
 Australian Formula 1, an Australian motor racing category current from 1970 to 1983
 British Formula One Championship, a domestic British F1 championship that ran from 1978 to 1982
 South African Formula One Championship, a F1 championship run in South Africa and Rhodesia from 1960 to 1975

Games
 Formula 1 (board game), an early 1960s board game from Waddingtons

In video games
 Formula One (series), developed by Psygnosis/Studio Liverpool for the Sony PlayStation console range
 Formula 1 (video game)
 Formula 1 97
 Formula 1 98
 Formula One 99
 Formula One 2000 (video game)
 Formula One 2001 (video game)
 Formula One Arcade, 2002
 Formula One 2002 (video game)
 Formula One 2003 (video game)
 Formula One 04
 Formula One 05
 Formula One 06
 Formula One Championship Edition, 2007
 Formula One (1985 video game), published by CRL for the ZX Spectrum and Amstrad CPC computers
 Formula One: Built to Win, a 1990 Nintendo Entertainment System video game
 Formula One Grand Prix (video game), a 1992 game by MicroProse
 Formula One World Championship: Beyond the Limit, a 1994 Sega Mega CD game by Sega Sports

Other uses
 Hotel Formule 1, a budget hotel chain in Europe

See also
 Formula 1000, a 1-L (1000-cc) engine open-wheel open-cockpit single-seater racing category
 Formula One Grand Prix (disambiguation)
 F1 (disambiguation)